Howard Samuel "Trey" Thompkins III (born May 29, 1990) is an American professional basketball player for Zenit Saint Petersburg of the VTB United League.

High school career
Thompkins attended the Wesleyan School in Peachtree Corners, Georgia. During his junior year, Thompkins decided to attend Oak Hill Academy where he averaged 15.8 points per game and 8.9 rebounds. For his senior season, Thompkins averaged 27.5 points and 14.7 rebounds for Wesleyan as they won the Georgia High School Association Class AA state championship. In May 2007, Thompkins committed to the University of Georgia for the 2008-2009 NCAA season despite offers from many other schools.

Considered a four-star recruit by Rivals.com, Thompkins was listed as the No. 11 power forward and the No. 30 player in the nation in 2008.

College career
In Thompkins's freshman season for the Bulldogs, he was named to the SEC All-Freshman team while leading the team in rebounding (7.4) and blocks (31 total) and second in points (12.6). He missed the preseason practices and first four regular season games due to injury while the team eventually finished the season below expectations, having head coach Dennis Felton fired midseason.

In his sophomore season, Thompkins skied to averages of 17.7 points and 8.3 rebounds. He was a unanimous vote for the first team All-SEC selection.

Thompkins leveled out in his junior year statistically, while the Bulldogs eventually made it to the 2011 NCAA Men's Division I Basketball Tournament only to be eliminated 68–65 in the first round to the Washington Huskies. He was once again a first team All-SEC selection.

While preparing for the draft, there were concerns about Thompkins' body fat level of 15.5%.  Jay Bilas describes Trey Thompkins' body fat percentage as "pretty good if you're a sea lion."

Professional career

Los Angeles Clippers (2011–13)
Thompkins announced that he would leave Georgia and forgo his senior season to enter the 2011 NBA draft on April 5, 2011.

Thompkins was drafted with the 37th overall pick in the 2nd round of the 2011 NBA draft by the Los Angeles Clippers. In his first season with the Clippers, he averaged 2.4 points and 1 rebound over 24 games played. In the summer of 2012, during the NBA Summer League, he suffered a bone bruise on his left knee, which sidelined him off the court for nearly two years, including the rehabilitation time. He was waived by the Clippers on March 14, 2013.

Nizhny Novgorod (2014–2015)
On August 4, 2014, Thompkins signed a one-year deal with the Russian team Nizhny Novgorod. From the start of the 2014–15 season, he saw a lot of trust from the team's head coach, Ainars Bagatskis, as he played at least 20 minutes per game, in both the VTB United League and the EuroLeague. On November 6, in a home game loss to Anadolu Efes, he had 14 points and 10 rebounds, making his first EuroLeague double-double. On November 21, against Dinamo Sassari, he grabbed a season-high 15 rebounds, also scoring 13 points. Nizhny Novgorod finished 4th in its EuroLeague group, and advanced to the EuroLeague Top 16.

On February 6, in a game against Unicaja, he scored a season-high 27 points, and added 13 rebounds, to help his team win the first game in the EuroLeague Top 16. That was also his third straight EuroLeague game win which he scored more than 20 points. Nizhny Novgorod eventually finished its participation in the EuroLeague by finishing last in its Top 16 group, with 3 wins in 14 games. Over 23 EuroLeague games played, Thompkins averaged 14.5 points and a third best in the league 8.1 rebounds per game. Nizhny Novgorod ended the competition in the VTB United League, after being eliminated by CSKA Moscow, by a 3–0 series sweep in the league's playoff semifinal series.

Real Madrid (2015–2022)
On August 26, 2015, Thompkins signed a one-year deal with the Spanish team Real Madrid. On July 16, 2016, Thompkins signed a two-year contract extension with Real Madrid.

In May 2018, Real Madrid won the 2017–18 EuroLeague championship, after defeating Fenerbahçe Doğuş in the final game with 85–80. Over 28 EuroLeague games, Thompkins averaged 9.5 points, 5.1 rebounds and 1.1 assists per game.

On July 6, 2018, Thompkins re-signed a two-year deal with the Spanish team Real Madrid.

On March 12, 2020, Thompkins tested positive for SARS-CoV-2, the virus responsible for the COVID-19 pandemic. He was the first professional basketball player in Europe to be diagnosed with the virus.

On June 9, 2020, Thompkins signed a three-year extension with the team.

On June 27, 2022, Thompkins officially parted ways with the club after seven seasons.

Zenit (2022–present)
On July 13, 2022, he has signed with Zenit Saint Petersburg of the VTB United League.

Career statistics

College

|-
| style="text-align:left;"| 2008–09
| style="text-align:left;"| Georgia
| 28 || 23 || 26.0 || .434 || .384 || .726 || 7.4 || .8 || 1.0 || 1.1 || 12.6
|-
| style="text-align:left;"| 2009–10
| style="text-align:left;"| Georgia
| 31 || 29 || 31.0 || .483 || .377 || .762 || 8.3 || 1.9 || 1.0 || 1.2 || 17.7
|-
| style="text-align:left;"| 2010–11
| style="text-align:left;"| Georgia
| 30 || 29 || 31.2 || .481 || .311 || .689 || 7.6 || 1.4 || 1.1 || 1.7 || 16.4
|-class="sortbottom"
| align="left" | Career
| align="left" | 
| 89 || 81 || 29.5 || .469 || .357 || .729 || 7.8 || 1.4 || 1.0 || 1.3 || 15.7

NBA

Regular season

|-
| style="text-align:left;"| 
| style="text-align:left;"| LA Clippers
| 24 || 0 || 5.0 || .393 || .308 || .714 || 1.0 || .1 || .1 || .1 || 2.4
|-class="sortbottom"
| align="left" | Career
| align="left" | 
| 24 || 0 || 5.0 || .393 || .308 || .714 || 1.0 || .1 || .1 || .1 || 2.4

EuroLeague

|-
| style="text-align:left;"| 2014–15
| style="text-align:left;"| Nizhny Novgorod
| 23 || 18 || 27.5 || .483 || .374 || .837 || 8.1 || 1.6 || .8 || .4 || 14.5 || 15.7
|-
| style="text-align:left;"| 2015–16
| style="text-align:left;" rowspan=3| Real Madrid
| 15 || 6 || 15.2 || .390 || .350 || 1.000 || 3.0 || 1.1 || .1 || .3 || 5.9 || 4.9
|-
| style="text-align:left;"| 2016–17
| 26 || 3 || 13.7 || .475 || .475 || .810 || 2.4 || .2 || .3 || .2 || 6.1 || 4.6
|-
| style="text-align:left;background:#AFE6BA;"| 2017–18†
| 28 || 16 || 21.4 || .480 || .424 || .833 || 5.1 || 1.1 || .6 || .3 || 9.5 || 10.9
|-class="sortbottom"
| align="left" | Career
| align="left" | 
| 92 || 43 || 19.7 || .469 || .409 || .846 || 4.8 || 1.0 || .5 || .3 || 9.2 || 9.3

International career
Thompkins represented the Under-19 United States national team at the 2009 Under-19 World Championship, which was held in New Zealand, and where the USA team won the gold medal. Over 9 tournament games, he averaged 10.6 points and 5 rebounds per game.

Personal life
His father, Howard Thompkins Jr., played college basketball at Wagner College, and was later drafted by the Atlanta Hawks in 1981.

References

External links
 
 Trey Thompkins at draftexpress.com
 Trey Thompkins at eurobasket.com
 Trey Thompkins at euroleague.net
 Trey Thompkins at nba.com
 Trey Thompkins at sports-reference.com
 Trey Thompkins at vtb-league.com
 
 

1990 births
Living people
American expatriate basketball people in Russia
American expatriate basketball people in Spain
American men's basketball players
Basketball players from Georgia (U.S. state)
BC Nizhny Novgorod players
Georgia Bulldogs basketball players
Liga ACB players
Los Angeles Clippers draft picks
Los Angeles Clippers players
Parade High School All-Americans (boys' basketball)
People from Lithonia, Georgia
People from Peachtree Corners, Georgia
Power forwards (basketball)
Real Madrid Baloncesto players
Sportspeople from DeKalb County, Georgia